The 2021 Copa do Brasil third round was the third round of the 2021 Copa do Brasil football competition. It was played from 1 to 16 June 2021. A total of 32 teams competed in the third round to decide 16 places in the final rounds of the 2021 Copa do Brasil.

Draw
The draw for the third round was held on 23 April 2021, 14:00 at CBF headquarters in Rio de Janeiro. In a first draw, the 32 teams, seeded by their CBF ranking, were drawn into 16 ties. The home and away teams of each leg were decided in a second draw. CBF ranking is shown in parentheses.

Format
In the third round, each tie was played on a home-and-away two-legged basis. If the aggregate score was level, the second-leg match would go straight to the penalty shoot-out to determine the winners.

Matches
All times are Brasília time, BRT (UTC−3)

|}

Match 61

Santos won 3–0 on aggregate and advanced to the round of 16.

Match 62

Bahia won 2–0 on aggregate and advanced to the round of 16.

Match 63

Tied 1–1 on aggregate, CRB won on penalties and advanced to the round of 16.

Match 64

São Paulo won 11–4 on aggregate and advanced to the round of 16.

Match 65

Fluminense won 3–2 on aggregate and advanced to the round of 16.

Match 66

Fortaleza won 4–1 on aggregate and advanced to the round of 16.

Match 67

Grêmio won 2–0 on aggregate and advanced to the round of 16.

Match 68

Tied 2–2 on aggregate, Criciúma won on penalties and advanced to the round of 16.

Match 69

Athletico Paranaense won 2–1 on aggregate and advanced to the round of 16.

Match 70

Atlético Mineiro won 4–1 on aggregate and advanced to the round of 16.

Match 71

Atlético Goianiense won 2–0 on aggregate and advanced to the round of 16.

Match 72

Vitória won 3–2 on aggregate and advanced to the round of 16.

Match 73

Tied 1–1 on aggregate, Juazeirense won on penalties and advanced to the round of 16.

Match 74

ABC won 4–3 on aggregate and advanced to the round of 16.

Match 75

Flamengo won 3–0 on aggregate and advanced to the round of 16.

Match 76

Vasco da Gama won 2–1 on aggregate and advanced to the round of 16.

References

2021 Copa do Brasil
2021 in Brazilian football